Recital Paris 71 is an album by American jazz saxophonist and composer Anthony Braxton recorded in 1971 and released on the Futura label. The album features a solo saxophone performance of "Come Sunday" (dedicated to Johnny Hodges), and a composition by Braxton performed on four multitracked pianos (dedicated to pianist/composer David Tudor.)

Track listing
 "Come Sunday" (Duke Ellington) - 25:10
 "G N 6 (X' 70B)" (Dedicated To David Tudor) 	8:52

Personnel
Anthony Braxton - alto saxophone, piano

References

Futura Records albums
Anthony Braxton albums
1971 albums